John Traill (11 January 1835 – 8 June 1897) was the owner of Traill's Temperance Coffee House which was regularly visited by Greyfriars Bobby.

Early and personal life
Traill was born in 1835 in Dunfermline and was the son of a weaver. He and his wife Mary had two children called Alexander and Elizabeth Ann.

Traill's Temperance Coffee House
Traill's Temperance Coffee House was a temperance coffee house located on the ground floor of 6 Greyfriars Place. In 1975, 4, 5 and 6 Greyfriars Place were B listed by Historic Environment Scotland. In modern times, Greyfriars Bobby's Bar and Greyfriars Bobby Fountain are located in Greyfriars Place.

Later years and death
In 1895, Oliver Morris painted a picture of Traill which has been on display at the City Art Centre since 1962. Traill died in 1897 and is buried at Newington Cemetery in Edinburgh.

In popular culture

John Traill is featured in the 1912 novel Greyfriars Bobby. Traill is depicted as the landlord of Ye Olde Greyfriars Dining-Rooms and is commonly referred to as Mr. Traill.
Traill is played by Edmund Gwenn in the 1949 Metro-Goldwyn-Mayer film Challenge to Lassie based on the novel.
Traill is played by Laurence Naismith in the 1961 Disney film Greyfriars Bobby based on the novel.

References

1835 births
1897 deaths
Greyfriars Bobby
People from Dunfermline
Scottish temperance activists